The Artésien class was a type of 64-gun ships of the line of the French Navy.

Ships in class
 
Builder: 
Begun:
Launched: 1765
Completed:
Fate:

 
Builder: 
Begun:
Launched: 1771
Completed:
Fate:

 
Builder: 
Begun:
Launched: 1771
Completed:
Fate:

 
Builder: 
Begun:
Launched: 1773
Completed:
Fate:

 
Builder: 
Begun:
Launched: 1773
Completed:
Fate: Captured by the Royal Navy on 24 February 1780 and commissioned as HMS Prothee. Used as a prison ship from 1799 and broken up September 1815

References

Sources

 
Ship of the line classes from France
 
Ship classes of the French Navy